Narromine is a closed railway station in the town of Narromine on the Main West railway line in New South Wales, Australia. The station opened in 1882 but by 1939 revenue at the station was declining, and by 1954 the station was in a state of disrepair, and is now closed to passenger services, as passenger services now do not proceed past the town of Dubbo. The station survives in good condition and has been restored.

To the west of Narromine station lies the junction of the branch-line to Parkes, which forms part of a cross country route to the Main South railway line at Cootamundra.

References

External links

Disused regional railway stations in New South Wales
Railway stations in Australia opened in 1882
Main Western railway line, New South Wales